Pternozyga is a genus of moths belonging to the subfamily Tortricinae of the family Tortricidae.

Species
Pternozyga anisoptera Diakonoff, 1941
Pternozyga argodoxa Meyrick, 1922
Pternozyga haeretica Meyrick, 1908
Pternozyga melanoterma Diakonoff, 1953

See also
List of Tortricidae genera

References

 , 1908, J. Bombay nat. Hist. Soc. 18: 621.
 , 2005, World Catalogue of Insects 5.

External links
tortricidae.com

Archipini
Tortricidae genera